Sad Kharv (also Romanized as Şad Kharv, Sadd-e Kharū, and Sad Kharv; also known as Sūdkhārv) is a village in Kah Rural District, Central District, Davarzan County, Razavi Khorasan Province, Iran. At the 2006 census, its population was 2,296, in 753 families.

References 

Populated places in Davarzan County